Stephen Glynne may refer to:

Sir Stephen Glynne, 3rd Baronet (1665–1729)
Sir Stephen Glynne, 4th Baronet (c. 1696–1729)
Sir Stephen Glynne, 7th Baronet (1744–1780)
Sir Stephen Glynne, 8th Baronet (1780–1815)
Sir Stephen Glynne, 9th Baronet (1807–1874), Welsh Conservative politician, brother-in law of Prime Minister William Gladstone, and architectural antiquarian

See also
Glynne baronets
Glyn Stephens